Alan Spencer Newman (born October 2, 1969) is a former professional baseball pitcher. He played parts of two seasons in Major League Baseball, in 1999 for the Tampa Bay Devil Rays and 2000 for the Cleveland Indians. He then went on to play three seasons in Japan, 2001–02 for the Yakult Swallows and 2003 for the Hiroshima Toyo Carp.

External links 

1969 births
Living people
Major League Baseball pitchers
Baseball players from California
Tampa Bay Devil Rays players
Cleveland Indians players
Yakult Swallows players
Hiroshima Toyo Carp players
Fullerton Hornets baseball players
American expatriate baseball players in Japan
Elizabethton Twins players
Kenosha Twins players
Visalia Oaks players
Orlando Sun Rays players
Nashville Xpress players
Indianapolis Indians players
Alexandria Aces players
Birmingham Barons players
Las Vegas Stars (baseball) players
Durham Bulls players
Buffalo Bisons (minor league) players
Atlantic City Surf players
Jackson Senators players
Long Beach Armada players